Prince Acquah (born 15 May 1994) is a Ghanaian professional footballer who plays as a midfielder for Ghanaian Premier League side Aduana Stars. He previously played Kumasi Asante Kotoko.

Career

Heart of Lions 
Acquah featured for Heart of Lions and was an integral member of the squad before joining Asante Kotoko in 2016.

Asante Kotoko 
Acquah joined Kumasi Asante Kotoko in 2016. He played for them for 3 seasons from 2017 to 2020. In the 2017 season, and 2018 season he featured in 12 matches and 8 matches respectively. The latter was however truncated due to the dissolution of the GFA in June 2018, as a result of the Anas Number 12 Expose. In the 2019 GFA Normalization Committee Special Competition, he played 9 matches and helped Kotoko win the title and qualify for the 2019–20 CAF Champions League. After going down the perking order, he parted ways with the club in October 2019.

Aduana Stars 
After missing terminating his contract with Kotoko and missing out on the 2019–20 Ghana Premier League season, Acquah signed for  Dormaa-based side Aduana Stars in April 2020 on a free transfer, in the process reuniting with Paa Kwesi Fabin who coached him in 2018 whilst at Asante Kotoko. He scored a goal from 40 yards to help Aduana secure a 2–0 victory over Accra Hearts of Oak. His goal was regarded as a goal of the season contender. He was adjudged the man of the match for his performance after the game.

Honours

Club 
Asante Kotoko

 GFA Normalization Committee Special Competition: 2019

References

External links 

 
 

1994 births
Living people
Association football midfielders
Ghanaian footballers
Heart of Lions F.C. players
Asante Kotoko S.C. players
Aduana Stars F.C. players
Ghana Premier League players